Data sovereignty is the idea that data are subject to the laws and governance structures of the nation where they are collected. The concept of data sovereignty is closely linked with data security, cloud computing, network sovereignty and technological sovereignty. Unlike technological sovereignty, which is vaguely defined and can be used as an umbrella term in policymaking, data sovereignty is specifically concerned with questions surrounding the data itself. Data sovereignty as the idea that data is subject to the laws and governance structures within one nation is usually discussed in two ways: in relation to Indigenous groups and Indigenous autonomy from post-colonial states or in relation to transnational data flow. With the rise of cloud computing, many countries have passed various laws around control and storage of data, which all reflects measures of data sovereignty. More than 100 countries have some sort of data sovereignty laws in place. With self-sovereign identity (SSI) the individual identity holders can fully create and control their credentials, although a nation can still issue a digital identity in that paradigm.

History 
The Snowden revelations on the National Security Agency's (NSA) PRISM program provided a catalyst for global data sovereignty discussions. It was revealed that the US was collecting vast swaths of data not only from American citizens, but from around the world. The program was designed “to "receive" emails, video clips, photos, voice and video calls, social networking details, logins and other data held by a range of US internet firms” such as American tech companies like Facebook, Apple, Google and Twitter among others.  In the wake of the revelations, countries became increasingly concerned with who could access their national information and its potential repercussions. Their worries were further exacerbated due to the US Patriot Act. Under the act, US officials were granted access to any information physically within the United States (such as server farms), regardless of the information's origin. This meant that any information collected by an American server would have no protection from the US government.

Another instance that put data sovereignty in the news was a case between Microsoft and the US government. In 2013, the Department of Justice (DoJ) demanded that Microsoft grant the DoJ access to emails “related to a narcotics case from a Hotmail account hosted in Ireland”. Microsoft refused, stating that this transfer would result in the company breaking data localization and protecting laws in the EU.  The initial ruling was in favour of the US government, with Magistrate James Francis concluding that American companies “must turn over private information when served with a valid search warrant from US law enforcement agencies. Microsoft asked for an appeal and went to court again in 2016 with the case Microsoft v. United States. John Frank, the VP for EU Government Affairs at Microsoft stated in a 2016 blog post that a US court of appeals ruled in favour of Microsoft, supporting the notion that "US search warrants do not reach our customers' data stored abroad". On October 23, 2017, Microsoft said it would drop the lawsuit as a result of a policy change by the Department of Justice (DoJ) that represented “most of what Microsoft was asking for."

Indigenous context 

Discussions of Indigenous data sovereignty for Indigenous peoples of Canada, New Zealand, Australia and the United States of America are currently underway. Data sovereignty is seen by Indigenous peoples and activists as a key piece to self-governance structures and important pillar of Indigenous sovereignty as a whole. The decolonization of data is seen by activists as a way to give power to Indigenous people to "determine who should be counted among them" and would be able to better reflect the "interests, values and priorities of native people". Scholars also argue that given the power over their own data, Indigenous peoples would be able to decide which data gets disseminated to the public and what does not, a decision typically made by the settler government.

In New Zealand, Te Mana Raraunga, a Māori data sovereignty network, created a charter to outline what Māori data sovereignty would look like. Some of the requests in the charter included "asserting Māori rights and interests in relation to data", "advocating for Māori involvement in the governance of data repositories" and "Supporting the development of Māori data infrastructure and security systems".

In Canada, Gwen Phillips of the Ktunaxa nation of British Columbia has been advocating for Ktunaxa data sovereignty and other pathways towards self-governance in the community.

National data sovereignty measures

Canada has enacted various data sovereignty measures, primarily on storage of Canadian data on Canadian servers. As part of Canada's IT strategy for the years 2016–2020, data localization measures were discussed as a way to uphold citizens' privacy. By using Canadian servers to store Canadian data as opposed to American servers, this would safeguard Canadian data from being subject to the US Patriot Act. In 2017, it was discovered that Shared Services Canada and the Communications Security Establishment were "exploring options for sensitive data storage on U.S.-based servers" with Microsoft".

Also in 2016, the EU Parliament approved their own data sovereignty measures within a General Data Protection Regulation (GDPR). This regulatory package homogenizes data protection policy for all European Union members. It also includes an addendum that establishes extraterritorial jurisdiction for its rules to extend to any data controller or processor whose subjects are EU citizens, regardless of the location the holding or processing is conducted. This forces companies based outside of the EU to reevaluate their sitewide policies and align them with another country's law. The GDPR also effectively replaced the 1995 European Data Protection Directive that had originally established the free movement of personal data between member state borders, and in doing so granted interoperability of such data among nearly thirty countries.

Criticism 
A common criticism of data sovereignty brought forward by corporate actors is that it impedes and has the potential to destroy processes in cloud computing. Since cloud storage might be dispersed and disseminated in a variety of locations at any given time, it is argued that governance of cloud computing is difficult under data sovereignty laws. For example, data held in the cloud may be illegal in some jurisdictions but legal in others.

According to economist and political scientist Professor Susan Ariel Aaronson, founder and director of the Digital Trade and Data Governance Hub at George Washington University, "some governments are seeking to regulate the commercial use of personal data without enacting clear rules governing public sector use... The hoarding of data by nations or firms may reduce data generativity and the public benefits of data analysis."

See also
 Data governance
 Data localization
 Digital inclusion
 Digital self-determination
 Information privacy (data protection)
 Legal aspects of computing
 Privacy
 Privacy law

References

Political ideologies
Data laws